Thomas Hodge was a British colonial governor. He was Deputy Governor of Anguilla from 1782 until around 1805.

References

Deputy Governors of Anguilla